Cecil A. Allan (1 August 1914 – 11 May 2003) was a Northern Irish footballer who made one appearance for Ireland in 1935. He played as a full-back in the Irish Football League for Linfield and Cliftonville, earning a move to Chelsea in the Football League, but failed to make an appearance. He joined Colchester United in the Southern League, but his career was interrupted by injury and World War II.

Early life
Born in Belfast, Allan was the youngest of nine brothers. His mother died when he was four-years-old and his father, who had worked on the RMS Titanic, was killed as an innocent passer-by in a gun battle between the IRA and the Black and Tans.

Club career
Allan began his career at Linfield, playing for the reserve team known as Linfield Swifts. He moved to Cliftonville where he featured in the first-team whilst following in his father's footsteps, working at Harland and Wolff. In the 1935–36 season, he featured in two Inter-League matches, a 2–1 win over The Football League and a 3–2 loss to the Scottish Football League.

Allan joined Chelsea in 1936, but damaged his cartilage on his debut for the reserve team, never making a first-team appearance for the club. He was signed by Colchester United in 1938 for £2,000, making 16 appearances in all competitions spanning from 1938 to 1945. During the war years, Allan made guest appearances for Dundela, Bangor and Crewe Alexandra. He left the U's to help run Colchester Casuals in 1949.

International career
Allan made his full international debut for Ireland on 19 October 1935 at the age of 21. The match was held at Windsor Park as England defeated Ireland 3–1. He also represented Northern Ireland at amateur level and the Irish League.

Later life
Following the war, Allan settled in the Colchester area, marrying a local woman and returned to work in the metal industry. He managed the works football team and was also a pianist for the works dance band. Alongside fellow former Colchester United player George Leslie, Allan ran local club Colchester Casuals. He made an appearance at Layer Road in the early 2000s as, at the time, the oldest surviving U's player. Cecil Allan died at the age of 88 on 11 May 2003.

References

1914 births
2003 deaths
Association footballers from Northern Ireland
Association footballers from Belfast
Association football fullbacks
Linfield F.C. players
Cliftonville F.C. players
Chelsea F.C. players
Colchester United F.C. players
Crewe Alexandra F.C. wartime guest players
Colchester Casuals F.C. players
NIFL Premiership players
Southern Football League players
Irish League representative players
Northern Ireland amateur international footballers
Pre-1950 IFA international footballers